The Women's high jump competition at the 2012 Summer Olympics in London, United Kingdom. The event was held at the Olympic Stadium on 9–11 August.

In the qualifying round, only four athletes attempted the automatic qualifying height of 1.96, the clearance necessary for Svetlana Radzivil to advance beyond two misses at 1.93 and while failing, Irina Gordeeva needed to cover her chances in case Ariane Friedrich or Antonia Stergiou had cleared it.

In the final, it was down to four athletes at 2 metres, in the process losing defending champion Tia Hellebaut and reigning indoor champion Chaunte Lowe. Ruth Beitia was clean at 2.00 with one earlier miss, but she could go no further. Brigetta Barrett was getting into a habit of clearing heights on her second attempt.  But she also cleared 2.03 on her second attempt, while Svetlana Shkolina cleared on her third, putting Barrett in silver medal position and Shkolina in the bronze position.  The leader was reigning world champion Anna Chicherova, clean through 2.03, which would have been enough for the gold medal.  But the competition went on, all three attempting 2.05.  Chicherova cleared on her second attempt while Barrett and Shkolina missed three times to settle the medals for sure.

Seven years after the competition, on 1 February 2019, Svetlana Shkolina was among twelve Russian track and field athletes found guilty of doping during the 2012 Summer Olympics, and was stripped of her bronze medal. In 2021, IOC reallocated her bronze medal to Ruth Beitia of Spain, the athlete who originally got fourth in the event.

In 2016, victorious Chicherova's 2008 drug re-test returned positive for dehydrochlormethyltestosterone (turinabol). Her 2008 bronze was rescinded, but 2012 gold was not affected.

Competition format
The competition consisted of two rounds, qualification and final.  Athletes start with a qualifying round. Jumping in turn, each athlete attempts to achieve the qualifying height. If they fail at three jumps in a row, they are eliminated. After a successful jump, they receive three more attempts to achieve the next height. Once all jumps have been completed, all athletes who have achieved the qualifying height go through to the final. If fewer than 12 athletes achieve the qualifying standard, the best 12 athletes go through.  Cleared heights reset for the final, which followed the same format until all athletes fail three consecutive jumps.

Schedule

All times are British Summer Time (UTC+1)

Records
, the existing World and Olympic records were as follows.

Results

Qualification

Qual. rule: qualification standard 1.96m (Q) or at least best 12 qualified (q).

r = retired from competition

Final

References

Athletics at the 2012 Summer Olympics
High jump at the Olympics
2012 in women's athletics
Women's events at the 2012 Summer Olympics